Lectionary 138, designated by siglum ℓ 138 (in the Gregory-Aland numbering) is a Greek manuscript of the New Testament, on paper leaves. Palaeographically it has been assigned to the 15th century.

Description 

The codex contains lessons from the Gospels of John, Matthew, Luke lectionary (Evangelistarium), on 255 paper leaves. The text is written in Greek minuscule letters, in two columns per page, 22 lines per page.

History 

The manuscript once belonged to Christopher Palaeologus, who presented it on May 7, 1584, to the church of SS. Petri et Pauli in Naples.

The manuscript was added to the list of New Testament manuscripts by Scholz. 
It was examined and described by Scholz and Gregory. 

The manuscript is not cited in the critical editions of the Greek New Testament (UBS3).

Currently the codex is located in the Biblioteca Nazionale Vittorio Emanuele III (Ms. II. A. 6), in Naples.

See also 

 List of New Testament lectionaries
 Biblical manuscript
 Textual criticism
 Lectionary 46

Notes and references

Bibliography 

 J. M. A. Scholz, Biblisch-kritische Reise in Frankreich, der Schweiz, Italien, Palästine und im Archipel in den Jahren 1818, 1819, 1820, 1821: Nebst einer Geschichte des Textes des Neuen Testaments.

Greek New Testament lectionaries
15th-century biblical manuscripts